La Folie du docteur Tube is a 1915 short silent experimental film directed by Abel Gance, in which a scientist takes a white, cocaine-like powder which makes him hallucinate. Gance shows the man's hallucinations by using a series of distorting lenses on the camera. A copy of the film is preserved at the Cinémathèque française and has been digitised.

Plot
A famous and whimsical Doctor Tube invents a powder that makes people deformed. He first tries the experiment on a dog, then on his assistant, a black child, and on himself. The result amuses them a lot. He then sprays some powder on two lovely young girls who visit him, who are devastated by the result, as well as their fiancés who receive the same treatment. The bodies are so deformed that they become unrecognizable. The four young people come to blows with the professor, who then tells them that all they need to do is get rid of the dust that covers their clothes to regain a normal shape. Everything goes back to normal and the adventure ends around a table and a bottle of champagne.

Production
Abel Gance, about The Madness of Doctor Tube: "[...] I got drunk too quickly and said: 'I'm going to impress them all at the cinema because I have a very powerful idea.' I had the idea of writing The Madness of Doctor Tube. It was a story with the decomposition of light rays, which makes things no longer seen at all from the angle from which we see them. I used distorting mirrors, I did everything that I technically imagined the audience would appreciate immensely because it had never been done, and when I showed this film to the director and the people who interested in me, they said to themselves: 'He's crazy, we mustn't entrust him with a penny anymore, he's going to ruin us.'"

Cast
 Séverin-Mars as Dr Tube
 Albert Dieudonné as a young man

References

External links

1915 films
1915 short films
1910s French-language films
French silent short films
French black-and-white films
Films directed by Abel Gance
French avant-garde and experimental films
Mad scientist films
1910s avant-garde and experimental films
Silent horror films